Pacific Rim is a 2013 video game published and developed by Yuke's for Xbox 360 via Xbox Live Arcade and PlayStation 3 via PlayStation Network based on the film Pacific Rim. It is a fighting game where players choose between the film's Jaegers and Kaiju.

It was delisted from both digital stores in 2016.

Gameplay
In single-player mode, the player engages in several one-on-one melee battles to earn achievement points and upgrades for their characters. Jaegers have two health bars (as they require two pilots) while Kaijus have one. Each character has its own set of special attacks. For example, Gipsy Danger can fire its plasma cannon or use its chain swords, while Leatherback can disrupt a Jaeger's mobility by firing an electromagnetic pulse.

Divulgation
The game was first announced by the Australian Classification Board. A NeoGAF user posted several screenshots from the game, showing the monsters and robots of the movie battling in a number of environments. On July 7, 2013, a teaser trailer was released.

Reception
The game was met with mixed to negative reviews. It has a Metacritic score of 39 out of 100, based on 14 reviews. Jake Magee of IGN gave it a mediocre rating of 5.3, calling it "a flimsy movie tie-in that chooses to concentrate on repetitive and nonsensical story missions." Ben Rayner of Xboxer360 gave it a score of 60 out of 100, calling it "a 'freemium' game disguised as an XBLA game."

Pacific Rim: The Mobile Game

Pacific Rim: The Mobile Game is a 2013 video game developed by Reliance Games and Behaviour Interactive for iOS and Android smartphone platforms. According to Reliance Games' chief executive Manish Agarwal, the game is set before the events of the film, and the company worked extensively with director Guillermo del Toro in the game's design and testing.

Gameplay
During battle, the player uses the on-screen buttons to block or dodge a Kaiju attack. Once the Kaiju gives an opening, the player swipes the screen to execute an attack. The campaign spans 30 missions, with the player earning cash to upgrade their Jaeger by changing parts or buying single-use power-ups. Cash can also be collected to buy more powerful Jaegers.

Reception
Much like its console counterpart, Pacific Rim: The Mobile Game did not fare well with critics. The iOS version has a Metacritic score of 48 out of 100, based on 12 reviews. Mike Fahey of Kotaku criticized the game for its lack of innovation, saying it "isn't a bad Infinity Blade-style mobile game. It's just another one." Scott Nichols of Digital Spy gave the game two out of five stars, commenting that it is "priced at a premium, making the free-to-play structure rather insulting to fans."

See also
 List of Kaiju related games

References

Pacific Rim (franchise)
2013 video games
Alien invasions in video games
Android (operating system) games
Behaviour Interactive games
IOS games
Video games about mecha
PlayStation 3 games
PlayStation Network games
Video games based on films
Video games developed in Japan
Warner Bros. video games
Xbox 360 games
Xbox 360 Live Arcade games
Yuke's games
Multiplayer and single-player video games
Kaiju video games